Mammoth site may refer to:

 The Mammoth Site near Hot Springs, South Dakota
 Colby Mammoth Site near Worland, Wyoming, with specimens displayed at the University of Wyoming
 Hartley Mammoth Site, near Abiquiu, New Mexico
 Mammoth central, a paleontological site on the grounds of Santa Lucia Airport in Mexico
 Waco Mammoth Site, now the Waco Mammoth National Monument, Texas

See also
 Mammoth (disambiguation)
 Mammoth Hot Springs